The United Kingdom was represented by The Allisons in the 1961 Eurovision Song Contest with the song "Are You Sure?".

The Allisons an English pop duo were chosen as to represent the UK, the song came 2nd in the contest and reached No2 in the UK singles charts. They went on to come 2nd in the contest.

Before Eurovision

A Song For Europe 
The United Kingdom held a national pre-selection to choose the song that would go to the 1961 Eurovision Song Contest. It was held on 15 February 1961 and presented by Katie Boyle. The songs were voted on by a total of 120 jurors aged between 19 and 40 who were divided into 12 juries of ten in the following cities: Aberdeen, Glasgow, Belfast, Leeds, Bangor, Manchester, Norwich, Birmingham, Cardiff, London, Bristol and Southampton. 

The Eric Robinson Orchestra supplied the music and vocal backing was provided by the Beryl Stott Singers.

At Eurovision

Voting 
Every country had a jury of ten people. Every jury member could give one point to his or her favourite song.

References 

1961
Countries in the Eurovision Song Contest 1961
Eurovision
Eurovision